Sophie of Pomerania (1498–1568) was Queen of Denmark and Norway as the spouse of Frederick I. She is known for her independent rule over her fiefs Lolland and Falster, the castles in Kiel and Plön, and several villages in Holstein as queen.

Life
Born in Stettin (Szczecin) into the House of Pomerania, she was the daughter of Bogislaw X, Duke of Pomerania and the Polish princess Anna Jagiellon.

After the death of his first spouse Anna of Brandenburg in 1514, she married the future Frederick I of Denmark. Not much is known about her personality. She is not known to have played any political role. She is thought to have been interested in religion: a German psalm, "Gott ist mein Heil, mein Hülf und Trost", is believed to have been written by her.

Sophie became queen consort of Denmark and Norway upon the ascension of her spouse to the throne of Denmark in 1523 and Norway in 1524. She was crowned Queen of Denmark on 13 August 1525 (but never crowned Queen of Norway). At her coronation, she was granted Lolland and Falster, the castles in Kiel and Plön, and several villages in Holstein for her income. In 1526, Anne Meinstrup was appointed head lady-in-waiting for her court. Queen Sophie did not live at the Danish court as queen, but resided separated from her spouse on her property in Kiel, and treated her estates as her private independent fiefs, which caused disagreements with her spouse during his reign. The conflicts continued during the reign of his successors and until her death.

In 1533, she became a widow and moved to Gottorp Castle with her children, awaiting the outcome of the election of the new king. During the Count's Feud 1533–36, her estates was occupied. In 1538, the new king, Christian III, asked her to leave Gottorp because of the costs and reside in Kiel. She demanded the right to rule independently over her fiefs, but was in 1540 forced to accept the superiority of the king.

Issue
She had six children:
 Duke John of Holstein-Haderslev (28 June 1521 – 2 October 1580)
 Elizabeth (14 October 1524 – 15 October 1586), married:
 on 26 August 1543 to Duke Magnus III of Mecklenburg-Schwerin
 on 14 February 1556 to Ulrich, Duke of Mecklenburg
 Adolf, Duke of Holstein-Gottorp (25 January 1526 – 1 October 1586)
 Anne (1527 – 4 June 1535)
 Dorothea (1528 – 11 November 1575), married on 27 October 1573 to Duke Christof of Mecklenburg-Schwerin.
 Frederick, Bishop of Hildesheim and Schleswig (13 April 1532 – 27 October 1556).

Ancestry

Literature
Politikens bog om Danske monarker, af Benito Scocozza, 1997
Danske dronninger i tusind år, af Steffen Heiberg, 2000

References 
 Dansk biografisk Lexikon / XVI. Bind. Skarpenberg - Sveistrup (in Danish)

External links 

|-

|-

1498 births
1568 deaths
16th-century Danish people
16th-century Norwegian people
Danish royal consorts
House of Griffins
Norwegian royal consorts
People from Szczecin
People from the Duchy of Pomerania
16th-century Danish women
Danish Roman Catholic hymnwriters